The Philadelphia School of Occupational Therapy, also known as the Medical Services Building, is an historic school building which is located in the Rittenhouse Square West neighborhood of Philadelphia, Pennsylvania. 

It was designed by Georgina Pope Yeatman, who was one of only four women to be licensed as architects by the Commonwealth of Pennsylvania during the early part of her career. Yeatman later went on to become the first woman ever to be appointed to the post as director of architecture for the city of Philadelphia, which was the third largest city in Pennsylvania during the 1930s.

It was added to the National Register of Historic Places in 2003.

History and architectural features
A three-story, five-bay, "U"-shaped brown brick building, which was designed in the Art Deco style by Georgina Pope Yeatman of the Bissell & Sinkler architecture firm, the Philadelphia School of Occupational Therapy was built in 1930 as a two-story building. A third story was added in 1939.

The front facade features sculptural iron panels, sandstone carvings, and two-story brick pilasters with decorative caps. The Philadelphia School of Occupational Therapy occupied the building into the late-1950s, after which it housed medical offices associated with the University of Pennsylvania. It has been converted to apartments.

Notable alumni of the school included Kamala Nimbkar and Muriel Zimmerman. It was added to the National Register of Historic Places in 2003.

See also
 Georgina Pope Yeatman

Gallery

References

School buildings on the National Register of Historic Places in Philadelphia
Art Deco architecture in Pennsylvania
School buildings completed in 1930
Rittenhouse Square, Philadelphia
1930 establishments in Pennsylvania